Choose Life is an album by British singer Sandie Shaw. Though mostly remembered for her work in the 1960s, this album contains the first of several tracks recorded in the 1980s.

Shaw wrote and recorded the album, Choose Life, to publicize the World Peace Exposition in London in March 1983. Later in the year, a new phase in her career began after she received a letter from "two incurable Sandie Shaw fans" – singer Morrissey and lead guitarist Johnny Marr of the Smiths – telling her that "The Sandie Shaw legend cannot be over yet – there is more to be done." Shaw's husband was a friend of Geoff Travis of Rough Trade Records, the label to which the Smiths were signed, and she agreed to record some of their songs.

Track listing
 "Dragon King's Daughter" (Shaw, Phil Sawyer)
 "The Mermaid" (Shaw, Don Gould)
 "Let Down Your Hair" (Shaw, Phil Sawyer)
 "East Meets West" (Shaw, Nico Ramsden)
 "Bark Back at Dogs" (Shaw, Phil Sawyer)
 "Life Is Like a Star" (Shaw, Phil Sawyer, Ilona Kish)
 "Moontalk" (Shaw, Phil Sawyer)
 "Sister Sister" (Shaw, Phil Sawyer)
 "Wish I Was" (Shaw, Don Gould)

References

1983 albums
Sandie Shaw albums